Grand Av Arts/Bunker Hill station is an under construction underground light rail station on the A Line and the E Line of the Los Angeles Metro Rail system. It is located near the intersection of 2nd Place and Hope Street in the Bunker Hill section of Downtown Los Angeles.

Construction on the station is complete and the line is currently undergoing testing before an expected opening in early 2023.

In planning documents, the station was originally referred to as 2nd Place/Hope.

Service

Station layout 
The station will be connected to The Broad, and to Grand Avenue, by a pedestrian bridge.

Grand Av Arts/Bunker Hill is part of the Regional Connector project, a tunnel through Downtown Los Angeles that will connect the Metro Rail A, E, and L Lines. Under current plans, the station will be served by both the restructured A Line, connecting Long Beach and the San Gabriel Valley, and the restructured E Line, connecting Santa Monica and East Los Angeles. The Regional Connector is scheduled to open in early 2023.

Hours and frequency

Notable places nearby 
The station's name reflects the station's location within walking distance of museums and arts centers, including:
Ahmanson Theatre
Dorothy Chandler Pavilion
Mark Taper Forum
Museum of Contemporary Art, Los Angeles
Roy & Edna Disney CalArts Theatre (REDCAT)
The Broad
Walt Disney Concert Hall

References 

Future Los Angeles Metro Rail stations
Bunker Hill, Los Angeles
Railway stations scheduled to open in 2023